Live is the first officially released live recording from the band The Mars Volta. The EP was released in limited quantities in 2003 and is now difficult to find. Due to this, the EP has become a collectors item among fans. The first two tracks were recorded live at the XFM Studio in London, 2003. The last two tracks were recorded at the Electric Ballroom in London on July 9, 2003.

The jam in "Drunkship of Lanterns" later became part of "Cygnus...Vismund Cygnus" from Frances the Mute.

The album artwork is from the fable of Arachne (also Arachné). It has also been used as the backdrop during the band's live performances.

Track listing

Australian release
The Mars Volta repackaged the live EP and re-released it included with the Tour Edition release of De-Loused in the Comatorium, as well as an Australian-only single for "Televators" in January, 2004, coinciding with their tour with the Big Day Out. It features the studio version of "Televators", and then the same four live tracks.

The Mars Volta albums
2003 EPs
Live EPs
2003 live albums
Gold Standard Laboratories live albums
Gold Standard Laboratories EPs